Íþróttabandalag Akraness (abbreviated ÍA), is an Icelandic sports club founded in 1946 and based in the town of Akranes, west Iceland. Among the main sports its members can practice are basketball, football, golf, horsemanship, gymnastics, volleyball, bowling, karate, badminton, swimming and powerlifting. The football team plays in yellow shirts and socks, and black shorts.

Men's football

Honours
Icelandic Championships: 18
1951, 1953, 1954, 1957, 1958, 1960, 1970, 1974, 1975, 1977, 1983, 1984, 1992, 1993, 1994, 1995, 1996, 2001
Runner-up: 1952, 1955, 1959, 1961, 1963, 1964, 1965, 1969, 1978, 1979, 1985, 1997

Icelandic Cups: 9
1978, 1982, 1983, 1984, 1986, 1993, 1996, 2000, 2003
Runner-up: 1961, 1963, 1964, 1965, 1969, 1974, 1975, 1976, 1999, 2021

Icelandic League Cups: 3
1996, 1999, 2003

Icelandic Super Cup: 1
2003

Division one : 4
1968, 1991, 2011, 2018

Current squad

Out on loan

Managers

 Karl Guðmundsson (1948)
 Ríkharður Jónsson (1951–60)
 Guðjón Finnbogason (1960)
 Ríkharður Jónsson (1961–66)
 Helgi Hannesson (1967–68)
 Ríkharður Jónsson (1969–70)
 Magnús Kristjánsson (1971)
 Ríkharður Jónsson (1972–73)
 George Kirby (1974–75)
 Mike Ferguson (1976)
 George Kirby (1977–78)
 Klaus Hilpert (1979)
 George Kirby (1980)
 Steve Fleet (1981)
 George Kirby (1982)
 Hörður Helgason (1983–85)
 Jim Barron (1986)
 Guðjón Þórðarson (1987)
 Sigurður Lárusson (1988–89)
 George Kirby (1990)
 Guðjón Þórðarson (1991–93)
 Hörður Helgason (1994)
 Logi Ólafsson (1995)
 Guðjón Þórðarson (1996)
 Ivan Golac (1997)
 Logi Ólafsson (1997–99)
 Ólafur Þórðarson (1999–2006)
 Arnar Gunnlaugsson (2006)
 Bjarki Gunnlaugsson (2006)
 Guðjón Þórðarson (July 1, 2007 – July 21, 2008)
 Arnar Gunnlaugsson (July 2008 – July 9)
 Bjarki Gunnlaugsson (July 2008 – July 9)
 Þórður Þórðarson (July 16, 2009 – June 18, 2013)
 Þorvaldur Örlygsson (June 19, 2013 – Sept 28, 2013)
 Gunnlaugur Jónsson (Oct 10, 2013 - Aug 21, 2017)
 Jón Þór Hauksson (Aug 21, 2017 - Oct 1, 2017)
 Joey Guðjónsson (Oct 12, 2017 - Feb 1, 2022)
 Jón Þór Hauksson (Feb 1, 2022-)

European competition

Women's football

Current squad

Honours

Icelandic Championships: 3
1984, 1985, 1987
Runner-up: 1981, 1988, 1989, 1992

Icelandic Cups: 4
1989, 1991, 1992, 1993

Basketball

ÍA's men's team played in the top-tier Úrvalsdeild karla from 1993 to 2000, making the playoffs in 1994, 1997 and 1998. Its women's team played one season in the top-tier Úrvalsdeild kvenna during the 1995–1996 season.

References

External links

Official website (Icelandic)
Football section (Icelandic)
Supporters' site

Official Twitter account

 
Football clubs in Iceland
Association football clubs established in 1946
Multi-sport clubs in Iceland
1946 establishments in Iceland
Akranes